Nam Mae Lai is a river in Phrae Province of Thailand. It is a tributary of the Yom River, part of the Chao Phraya River basin.

Notes and references

Lai